Chung Hae-won (1 July 1959 – 1 May 2020) was a South Korean football player and coach.

International career
After winning the 1978 AFC Youth Championship as a member of the national under-20 team, Chung played as a left winger or a striker for senior national team. He scored two crucial goals to give South Korea a 2–1 win over North Korea in the semi-finals of the 1980 AFC Asian Cup, sending his team to the final.

Chung was selected for the national team for the 1988 Summer Olympics. However, he was injured during the first match against Soviet Union, and had to finish his competition early. He also participated as an attacking midfielder in the 1990 FIFA World Cup, but had difficulty in showing impressive performance.

Honours
Yonsei University
Korean President's Cup: 1980

Daewoo Royals
K League 1: 1984, 1987, 1991
Korean National Championship: 1989
Korean League Cup runner-up: 1986
Asian Club Championship: 1985–86
Afro-Asian Club Championship: 1986

South Korea U20
AFC Youth Championship: 1978

South Korea
AFC Asian Cup runner-up: 1980, 1988
Afro-Asian Cup of Nations: 1987

Individual
Korean President's Cup Best Player: 1980
Korean President's Cup top goalscorer: 1980
Korean FA Best XI: 1980, 1981, 1986, 1987, 1988
AFC Asian All Stars: 1982
K League 1 Best XI: 1986, 1987
K League 1 top goalscorer: 1986
K League 1 Most Valuable Player: 1987
AFC Asian Cup Team of the Tournament: 1988

References

External links
 
 
 

1959 births
2020 deaths
Association football forwards
South Korean footballers
South Korea international footballers
South Korean football managers
Busan IPark players
K League 1 players
K League 1 Most Valuable Player Award winners
1980 AFC Asian Cup players
Footballers at the 1988 Summer Olympics
1988 AFC Asian Cup players
1990 FIFA World Cup players
Olympic footballers of South Korea
Busan IPark managers
Yonsei University alumni
Footballers at the 1982 Asian Games
Asian Games competitors for South Korea